Naturkundemuseum, formerly Zinnowitzer Straße, is a Berlin U-Bahn station located on the  in the district Mitte.

History
The station was opened on 30 January 1923 as Stettiner Bahnhof after the then nearby long-distance station Stettiner Bahnhof. It is located 4.6 meters below Chausseestraße at the intersection of Chausseestraße and Invalidenstraße. It was built in 1913–14 and modified after 1919 by Alfred Grenander and Alfred Fehse, following the plans of Heinrich Jennen. Both developed a white station with a central platform; the station signs bore a yellow border. The BVG uses the abbreviation Zw for the station. The station has disabled access via a lift ascending to Invalidenstraße.

From April to July 1945 the station was closed because of war damage involving the ceiling openings. In 1951 it was renamed Nordbahnhof ("North Station"), since the nearby Stettiner Bahnhof was no longer called by its original name because the formerly German city of Stettin had become the Polish city of Szczecin after the war. After the construction of the Berlin Wall on 13 August 1961, the station was a "ghost station" and was not in service until 1 July 1990, after German reunification. West Berlin trains ran through this and other stations without stopping, since only a few central U6 stations were on the east side of the Berlin Wall. Following renovation work in the 1990s, for example the BVG built a lift and extended the platform to 100 m, the station became a protected building.

After 1991 the station was renamed Zinnowitzer Straße after a small street at the northern exit of the station. Since this name was largely meaningless, various passengers groups and politicians suggested in 2007 that the station be renamed either Museum für Naturkunde or Naturkundemuseum after the well-known nearby Museum für Naturkunde. After long discussions a renaming was announced, but then delayed. From 30 December 2008 the Berlin firm WALL AG, in anticipation of the renaming, made seven decorative advertisement panels available on which the Museum für Naturkunde displayed large-format color photographs of museum staff working with various objects from the collections. With the official change in the timetable by the BVG on 13 December 2009 the renaming as Naturkundemuseum finally took place.

References

External links 

U6 (Berlin U-Bahn) stations
Buildings and structures in Mitte
Railway stations in Germany opened in 1923